Scottish Affairs is a peer-reviewed academic journal covering Scottish politics. It was established in 1992 and has been published by Edinburgh University Press since 2014. It is the successor to the Scottish Government Yearbooks, which ran from 1976 to 1992.

The editor-in-chief is Michael Rosie (2015–present), who succeeded Lindsay Paterson (1992-2015).

References

External links

Scottish Government Yearbooks Archive

Political science journals
Politics of Scotland
1992 establishments in Scotland
Publications established in 1992
1992 in British politics